Karl Feichter (born 12 December 1954) is an Italian luger. He competed in the men's doubles event at the 1976 Winter Olympics.

References

External links
 

1954 births
Living people
Italian male lugers
Olympic lugers of Italy
Lugers at the 1976 Winter Olympics
People from Welsberg-Taisten
Sportspeople from Südtirol